Iolaus montana is a butterfly in the family Lycaenidae. It is found in Tanzania. The habitat consists of forests (including riverine forests).

The larvae feed on Phragmanthera rufescens and Phragmanthera usuiensis.

References

Butterflies described in 1978
Iolaus (butterfly)
Endemic fauna of Tanzania
Butterflies of Africa